Michael Volcan (September 17, 1932 – June 25, 2013) was a Canadian football player who played for the Edmonton Eskimos. He won the Grey Cup with the Eskimos in 1955 and 1956. Volcan was born and raised in Hamilton, Ontario and played football at the Hamilton Technical Institute and Kitchener-Waterloo Dutchmen. He won the Joe Clarke Memorial Trophy as the Eskimos MVP in 1962. He died in Edmonton in 2013.

References

1932 births
2013 deaths
Edmonton Elks players
Sportspeople from Hamilton, Ontario
Players of Canadian football from Ontario